The Philadelphia Wings are a lacrosse team based in Philadelphia, Pennsylvania playing in the National Lacrosse League (NLL). The 2008 season was the 22nd in franchise history.

The Wings had not made the playoffs in five years, the longest playoff drought in the history of the franchise. But the Wings began the season 6-0, and second-year players Athan Iannucci and Geoff Snider were rewriting the record books. Iannucci broke Gary Gait's single-season scoring record in the Wings' 14th game, and ended up with 71 goals. Snider set new records for loose balls (242), penalty minutes (103), and faceoffs won (318), and won 73.8% of his faceoffs, just short of his own record of 75% set in 2007. The Wings finished 4th in the East and made the playoffs again, but were beaten in the division semi-finals by the Buffalo Bandits.

Regular season

Conference standings

Game log
Reference:

Playoffs

Game log
Reference:

Player stats
Reference:

Runners (Top 10)

Note: GP = Games played; G = Goals; A = Assists; Pts = Points; LB = Loose balls; PIM = Penalty minutes

Goaltenders
Note: GP = Games played; MIN = Minutes; W = Wins; L = Losses; GA = Goals against; Sv% = Save percentage; GAA = Goals against average

Awards

Transactions

Trades

Roster
Reference:

See also
2008 NLL season

References

Philadelphia
Philly